Nian (also Romanized as Nīān, Neyān, and Nīyān; also known as Nuyān) is a village in Shamil Rural District, Takht District, Bandar Abbas County, Hormozgan Province, Iran. At the 2006 census, its population was 292, in 75 families.

References 

Populated places in Bandar Abbas County